The Miami Marlins' 2014 season was the 22nd season for the Major League Baseball franchise, and the third as the "Miami" Marlins. They finished 77–85, 19 games back in third place in the division. They failed to make the playoffs for the 11th consecutive season.

Spring training
The Marlins had an 18–12 win–loss record in spring training, their .600 winning percentage being the joint-best (along with Pittsburgh) among National League teams in pre-season. One of their games against the Atlanta Braves ended in a 6–6 tie and was therefore not included in the standings.

Season standings

National League East

National League Wild Card

Record vs. opponents

Game log

|- style="text-align:center; bgcolor="#bbffbb"
| 1 || March 31 || Rockies || 10–1 || Fernández (1–0) || de la Rosa (0–1) || — || 37,116 || 1–0
|-

|- style="text-align:center; bgcolor="#bbffbb"
| 2 || April 1 || Rockies || 4–3 || Eovaldi (1–0) || Anderson (0–1) || Cishek (1) || 15,906 || 2–0
|-  style="text-align:center; bgcolor="#ffbbbb"
| 3 || April 2 || Rockies || 5–6 || Lyles (1–0) || Álvarez (0–1) || Hawkins (1) || 15,866 || 2–1
|- style="text-align:center; bgcolor="#bbffbb"
| 4 || April 3 || Rockies || 8–5 || Ramos (1–0) || Belisle (0–1) || Cishek (2) || 15,378 || 3–1
|- style="text-align:center; bgcolor="#bbffbb"
| 5 || April 4 || Padres || 8–2 || Koehler (1–0) || Stults (0–1) || Hand (1) || 17,783 || 4–1
|- style="text-align:center; bgcolor="#bbffbb"
| 6 || April 5 || Padres || 5–0 || Fernández (2–0) || Cashner (0–1) || — || 35,188 || 5–1
|-  style="text-align:center; bgcolor="#ffbbbb"
| 7 || April 6 || Padres || 2–4 || Kennedy (1–1) || Eovaldi (1–1) || Street (2) || 22,496 || 5–2
|-  style="text-align:center; bgcolor="#ffbbbb"
| 8 || April 8 || @ Nationals || 0–5 || González (2–0) || Álvarez (0–2) || — || 21,728 || 5–3
|-  style="text-align:center; bgcolor="#ffbbbb"
| 9 || April 9 || @ Nationals || 7–10 || Clippard (1–1) || Mármol (0–1) || Soriano (2) || 21,190 || 5–4
|-  style="text-align:center; bgcolor="#ffbbbb"
| 10 || April 10 || @ Nationals || 1–7 || Strasburg (1–1) || Koehler (1–1) || — || 20,869 || 5–5
|-  style="text-align:center; bgcolor="#ffbbbb"
| 11 || April 11 || @ Phillies || 3–6 || Diekman (1–0) || Fernández (2–1) || Papelbon (2) || 22,283 || 5–6
|-  style="text-align:center; bgcolor="#ffbbbb"
| 12 || April 12 || @ Phillies || 4–5 (10) || Rosenberg (1–0) || Jennings (0–1) || — || 27,760 || 5–7
|-  style="text-align:center; bgcolor="#ffbbbb"
| 13 || April 13 || @ Phillies || 3–4 || Bastardo (1–1) || Dunn (0–1) || Papelbon (3) || 34,272 || 5–8
|-  style="text-align:center; bgcolor="#ffbbbb"
| 14 || April 14 || Nationals || 2–9 || Zimmermann (1–0) || Hand (0–1) || — || 18,788 || 5–9
|- style="text-align:center; bgcolor="#bbffbb"
| 15 || April 15 || Nationals || 11–2 || Koehler (2–1) || Strasburg (1–2) || — || 19,931 || 6–9
|-  style="text-align:center; bgcolor="#ffbbbb"
| 16 || April 16 || Nationals || 3–6 || Storen (1–0) || Dunn (0–2) || Soriano (3) || 20,178  || 6–10
|- style="text-align:center; bgcolor="#bbffbb"
| 17 || April 18 || Mariners || 8–4 || Cishek (1–0) || Medina (0–1) || — || 21,388 || 7–10 
|- style="text-align:center; bgcolor="#bbffbb"
| 18 || April 19 || Mariners || 7–0 || Álvarez (1–2) || Elías (1–2) || — || 24,003  || 8–10
|- style="text-align:center; bgcolor="#bbffbb"
| 19 || April 20 || Mariners || 3–2 || Dunn (1–2) || Wilhelmsen (0–1) || Cishek (3) || 20,228 || 9–10 
|-  style="text-align:center; bgcolor="#ffbbbb"
| 20 || April 21 || @ Braves || 2–4 (10) || Varvaro (1–0) || Caminero (0–1) || — || 16,055 || 9–11
|- style="text-align:center; bgcolor="#bbffbb"
| 21 || April 22 || @ Braves || 1–0 || Fernández (3–1) || Wood (2–3) || Cishek (4) || 18,275 || 10–11
|-  style="text-align:center; bgcolor="#ffbbbb"
| 22 || April 23 || @ Braves || 1–3 || Carpenter (1–0) || Dunn (1–3) || Kimbrel (6) || 21,508 || 10–12
|-  style="text-align:center; bgcolor="#ffbbbb"
| 23 || April 25 || @ Mets || 3–4 || Familia (1–2) || Cishek (1–1) || — || 21,171 || 10–13
|- style="text-align:center; bgcolor="#bbffbb"
| 24 || April 26 || @ Mets || 7–6 (10) || Dunn (2–3) || Farnsworth (0–1) || Cishek (5) || 21,492 || 11–13
|-  style="text-align:center; bgcolor="#ffbbbb"
| 25 || April 27 || @ Mets || 0–4 || Gee (2–1) || Koehler (2–2) || — || 26,861 || 11–14 
|- style="text-align:center; bgcolor="#bbffbb"
| 26 || April 29 || Braves || 9–0 || Fernández (4–1) || Wood (2–4) || — || 21,992 || 12–14
|- style="text-align:center; bgcolor="#bbffbb"
| 27 || April 30 || Braves || 9–3 || Eovaldi (2–1) || Harang (3–2) || — || 15,558 || 13–14
|-

|- style="text-align:center; bgcolor="#bbffbb"
| 28 || May 1 || Braves || 5–4 || Dunn (3–3) || Thomas (1–1) || Cishek (6) || 17,836 || 14–14 
|- style="text-align:center; bgcolor="#bbffbb"
| 29 || May 2 || Dodgers || 6–3 || Koehler (3–2) || Beckett (0–1) || — || 20,722 || 15–14
|-  style="text-align:center; bgcolor="#ffbbbb"
| 30 || May 3 || Dodgers || 7–9 (11) || League (1–1) || Mármol (0–2) || — || 24,104 || 15–15
|- style="text-align:center; bgcolor="#bbffbb"
| 31 || May 4 || Dodgers || 5–4 || Ramos (2–0) || Wright (2–2) || — || 30,145 || 16–15
|- style="text-align:center; bgcolor="#bbffbb"
| 32 || May 5 || Mets || 4–3 || Cishek (2–1) || Rice (0–1) || — || 20,606 || 17–15
|- style="text-align:center; bgcolor="#bbffbb"
| 33 || May 6 || Mets || 3–0 || Álvarez (2–2) || Colón (2–5) || — || 18,315 || 18–15
|- style="text-align:center; bgcolor="#bbffbb"
| 34 || May 7 || Mets || 1–0 || Cishek (3–1) || Torres (2–1) || — || 18,010 || 19–15
|- style="text-align:center; bgcolor="#bbffbb"
| 35 || May 8 || @ Padres || 3–1 (11) || Ramos (3–0) || Thayer (2–1) || Cishek (7) || 17,832 || 20–15
|-  style="text-align:center; bgcolor="#ffbbbb"
| 36 || May 9 || @ Padres || 1–10 || Ross (4–3) || Fernández (4–2) || — || 22,553 || 20–16
|-  style="text-align:center; bgcolor="#ffbbbb"
| 37 || May 10 || @ Padres || 3–9 || Stults (2–3) || Mármol (0–3) || — || 27,719 || 20–17
|-  style="text-align:center; bgcolor="#ffbbbb"
| 38 || May 11 || @ Padres || 4–5 || Erlin (2–4) || Álvarez (2–3) || Street (11) || 17,682 || 20–18
|-  style="text-align:center; bgcolor="#ffbbbb"
| 39 || May 12 || @ Dodgers || 5–6 || Haren (5–1) || Koehler (3–3) || Jansen (12) || 37,187 || 20–19
|-  style="text-align:center; bgcolor="#ffbbbb"
| 40 || May 13 || @ Dodgers || 1–7 || Beckett (1–1) || Turner (0–1) || — || 50,349 || 20–20
|- style="text-align:center; bgcolor="#bbffbb"
| 41 || May 14 || @ Dodgers || 13–3 || DeSclafani (1–0) || Maholm (1–4) || Wolf (1) || 39,498 || 21–20
|-  style="text-align:center; bgcolor="#ffbbbb"
| 42 || May 15 || @ Giants || 4–6 || Cain (1–3) || Eovaldi (2–2) || Romo (14) || 41,597 || 21–21
|- style="text-align:center; bgcolor="#bbffbb"
| 43 || May 16 || @ Giants || 7–5 || Dunn (4–3) || Casilla (1–1) || Cishek (8) || 41,819 || 22–21
|- style="text-align:center; bgcolor="#bbffbb"
| 44 || May 17 || @ Giants || 5–0 || Koehler (4–3) || Lincecum (3–3) || Cishek (9) || 41,619 || 23–21
|-  style="text-align:center; bgcolor="#ffbbbb"
| 45 || May 18 || @ Giants || 1–4 || Vogelsong (2–2) || Turner (0–2) || Romo (15) || 41,551 || 23–22
|-  style="text-align:center; bgcolor="#ffbbbb"
| 46 || May 20 || Phillies || 5–6 || Burnett (3–3) || DeSclafani (1–1) || Papelbon (12) || 18,699 || 23–23
|- style="text-align:center; bgcolor="#bbffbb"
| 47 || May 21 || Phillies || 14–5 || Eovaldi (3–2) || Kendrick (0–5) || — || 18,257 || 24–23
|- style="text-align:center; bgcolor="#bbffbb"
| 48 || May 22 || Phillies || 4–3 || Cishek (4–1) || Diekman (2–2) || — || 25,507 || 25–23
|-  style="text-align:center; bgcolor="#ffbbbb"
| 49 || May 23 || Brewers || 5–9 || Estrada (4–2) || Koehler (4–4) || — || 18,989 || 25–24
|- style="text-align:center; bgcolor="#bbffbb"
| 50 || May 24 || Brewers || 2–1 || Turner (1–2) || Peralta (4–4) || Cishek (10) || 25,819 || 26–24
|-  style="text-align:center; bgcolor="#ffbbbb"
| 51 || May 25 || Brewers || 1–7 || Nelson (1–0) || Wolf (0–1) || — || 21,897 || 26–25
|- style="text-align:center; bgcolor="#bbffbb"
| 52 || May 26 || @ Nationals || 3–2 || Eovaldi (4–2) || Roark (3–3) || Cishek (11) || 33,677 || 27–25
|-  style="text-align:center; bgcolor="#bbb"
| – || May 27 || @ Nationals || colspan=6 | Postponed (rain) Rescheduled for September 26
|- style="text-align:center; bgcolor="#bbffbb"
| 53 || May 28 || @ Nationals || 8–5 (10) || Slowey (1–0) || Blevins (2–2) || – || 24,830 || 28–25
|-  style="text-align:center; bgcolor="#ffbbbb"
| 54 || May 30 || Braves || 2–3 || Teherán (5–3) || Koehler (4–5) || Kimbrel (14) || 18,469 || 28–26
|-  style="text-align:center; bgcolor="#ffbbbb"
| 55 || May 31 || Braves || 5–9 || Santana (5–2) || Turner (1–3) || Kimbrel (15) || 26,875 || 28–27
|-

|-  style="text-align:center; bgcolor="#ffbbbb"
| 56 || June 1 || Braves || 2–4 || Wood (6–5) || Cishek (4–2) || Simmons (1) || 21,997 || 28–28
|- style="text-align:center; bgcolor="#bbffbb"
| 57 || June 2 || Rays || 3–1 || Wolf (1–1) || Cobb (1–3) || Cishek (12) || 18,155 || 29–28
|-  style="text-align:center; bgcolor="#bbffbb"
| 58 || June 3 || Rays || 1–0 || Álvarez (3–3) || Archer (3–3) || — || 21,303 || 30–28
|-  style="text-align:center; bgcolor="#bbffbb"
| 59 || June 4 || @ Rays || 5–4 || Koehler (5–5) || Price (4–5) || Cishek (13) || 10,897 || 31–28
|-  style="text-align:center; bgcolor="#bbffbb"
| 60 || June 5 || @ Rays || 11–6 || Turner (2–3) || Odorizzi (2–6) || — || 10,442 || 32–28
|-  style="text-align:center; bgcolor="#ffbbbb"
| 61 || June 6 || @ Cubs || 3–5 (13) || Villanueva (2–5) || Slowey (1–1) || — || 28,495 || 32–29
|-  style="text-align:center; bgcolor="#ffbbbb"
| 62 || June 7 || @ Cubs || 2–5 || Samardzija (2–5) || Wolf (1–2) || Strop (2) || 33,786 || 32–30
|-  style="text-align:center; bgcolor="#bbffbb"
| 63 || June 8 || @ Cubs || 4–3 || Dunn (5–3) || Strop (0–3) || Cishek (14) || 33,134 || 33–30
|-  style="text-align:center; bgcolor="#bbffbb"
| 64 || June 10 || @ Rangers || 8–5 || Morris (5–0) || Frasor (1–1) || Cishek (15) || 28,845 || 34–30
|-  style="text-align:center; bgcolor="#ffbbbb"
| 65 || June 11 || @ Rangers || 0–6 || Darvish (7–2) || Turner (2–4) || — || 31,512 || 34–31
|-  style="text-align:center; bgcolor="#ffbbbb"
| 66 || June 13 || Pirates || 6–8 (13) || Gómez (1–2) || Dunn (5–4) || — || 19,054 || 34–32
|-  style="text-align:center; bgcolor="#ffbbbb"
| 67 || June 14 || Pirates || 6–8 || Morton (4–7) || Wolf (1–3) || Grilli (11) || 21,195 || 34–33
|-  style="text-align:center; bgcolor="#bbffbb"
| 68 || June 15 || Pirates || 3–2 (10) || Ramos (4–0) || Hughes (3–2) || — || 25,953 || 35–33
|-  style="text-align:center; bgcolor="#ffbbbb"
| 69 || June 16 || Cubs || 4–5 || Villanueva (3–5) || Turner (2–5) || Russell (1) || 19,170 || 35–34
|-  style="text-align:center; bgcolor="#bbffbb"
| 70 || June 17 || Cubs || 6–5 || Dyson (1–0) || Schlitter (2–2) || Cishek (16) || 20,860 || 36–34
|-  style="text-align:center; bgcolor="#ffbbbb"
| 71 || June 18 || Cubs || 1–6 || Arrieta (3–1) || Eovaldi (4–3) || — || 27,032 || 36–35
|- style="text-align:center; bgcolor="#ffbbbb"
| 72 || June 19 || Mets || 0–1 || Wheeler (3–7) || Heaney (0–1) || — || 20,334 || 36–36
|- style="text-align:center; bgcolor="#bbffbb"
| 73 || June 20 || Mets || 3–2 || Álvarez (4–3) || Matsuzaka (3–1) || Cishek (17) || 19,725 || 37–36
|- style="text-align:center; bgcolor="#ffbbbb"
| 74 || June 21 || Mets || 0–4 || deGrom (1–4) || Koehler (5–6) || — || 24,502 || 37–37
|- style="text-align:center; bgcolor="#ffbbbb"
| 75 || June 22 || Mets || 5–11 || Niese (4–4) || DeSclafani (1–2) || — || 24,613 || 37–38
|-  style="text-align:center; bgcolor="#bbffbb"
| 76 || June 23 || @ Phillies || 4–0 || Eovaldi (5–3) || Hernández (3–6) || — || 32,161 || 38–38
|- style="text-align:center; bgcolor="#ffbbbb"
| 77 || June 24 || @ Phillies || 4–7|| Buchanan (4–3) || Heaney (0–2) || Papelbon (18) || 24,860 || 38–39
|-  style="text-align:center; bgcolor="#bbffbb"
| 78 || June 25 || @ Phillies || 3–2 || Álvarez (5–3) || Burnett (5–7) || Cishek (18) || 23,360 || 39–39
|-  style="text-align:center; bgcolor="#ffbbbb"
| 79 || June 26 || @ Phillies || 3–5 (14) || De Fratus (2–0) || Hatcher (0–1) || — || 34,168 || 39–40
|-  style="text-align:center; bgcolor="#ffbbbb"
| 80 || June 27 || Athletics || 5–9 || Gregerson (2–1) || Cishek (4–3) || — || 18,666 || 39–41
|-  style="text-align:center; bgcolor="#ffbbbb"
| 81 || June 28 || Athletics || 6–7 (14) || Johnson (4–2) || Turner (2–6) || Francis (1) || 19,358 || 39–42
|-  style="text-align:center; bgcolor="#ffbbbb"
| 82 || June 29 || Athletics || 3–4 || Milone (6–3) || Heaney (0–3) || Cook (1) || 21,917 || 39–43
|-

|-  style="text-align:center; bgcolor="#bbffbb"
| 83 || July 1 || Phillies || 5–4 (11) || Morris (6–0) || De Fratus (2–1) || — || 18,518 || 40–43 
|-  style="text-align:center; bgcolor="#bbffbb"
| 84 || July 2 || Phillies || 5–0 || Koehler (6–6) || Hamels (2–5) || — || 20,084 || 41–43
|-  style="text-align:center; bgcolor="#ffbbbb"
| 85 || July 3 || Phillies || 4–5 || Diekman (3–2) || Cishek (4–4) || Papelbon (19) || 24,915 || 41–44
|-  style="text-align:center; bgcolor="#ffbbbb"
| 86 || July 4 || @ Cardinals || 2–3 || Lynn (9–6) || Eovaldi (5–4) || Rosenthal (26) || 46,131 || 41–45
|-  style="text-align:center; bgcolor="#bbffbb"
| 87 || July 5 || @ Cardinals || 6–5 || Dunn (6–4) || Rosenthal (0–4) || Cishek (19) || 45,445 || 42–45
|-  style="text-align:center; bgcolor="#bbffbb"
| 88 || July 6 || @ Cardinals || 8–4 || Álvarez (6–3) || Gonzales (0–2) || — || 42,160 || 43–45
|-  style="text-align:center; bgcolor="#ffbbbb"
| 98 || July 7 || @ Diamondbacks || 1–9 || Anderson (6–4) || Koehler (6–7) || — || 17,103 || 43–46
|-  style="text-align:center; bgcolor="#bbffbb"
| 90 || July 8 || @ Diamondbacks || 2–1 || Dunn (7–4) || Reed (1–5) || Cishek (20) || 18,319 || 44–46
|-  style="text-align:center; bgcolor="#ffbbbb"
| 91 || July 9 || @ Diamondbacks || 3–4 (10) || Ziegler (4–1) || Cishek (4–5) || — || 18,268 || 44–47
|-  style="text-align:center; bgcolor="#ffbbbb"
| 92 || July 11 || @ Mets || 1–7 || Wheeler (5–8) || Álvarez (6–4) || — || 25,914 || 44–48
|-  style="text-align:center; bgcolor="#ffbbbb"
| 93 || July 12 || @ Mets || 4–5 || Black (2–2) || Dunn (7–5) || Mejía (10) || 35,283 || 44–49
|-  style="text-align:center; bgcolor="#ffbbbb"
| 94 || July 13 || @ Mets || 1–9 || deGrom (3–5) || Hand (0–2) || — || 28,187 || 44–50
|-  style="background:#bbb;"
|colspan=9| All–Star Break (July 14–17)
|-  style="text-align:center; bgcolor="#ffbbbb"
| 95 || July 18 || Giants || 1–9 || Bumgarner (11–7) || Eovaldi (5–5) || — || 23,017 || 44–51
|-  style="text-align:center; bgcolor="#ffbbbb"
| 96 || July 19 || Giants || 3–5 || Hudson (8–6) || Álvarez (6–5) || Casilla (5) || 24,882 || 44–52
|-  style="text-align:center; bgcolor="#bbffbb"
| 97 || July 20 || Giants || 3–2 || Hand (1–2) || Lincecum (9–6) || Cishek (21) || 25,221 || 45–52
|-  style="text-align:center; bgcolor="#bbffbb"
| 98 || July 21 || @ Braves || 3–1 (10) || Morris (7–0) || Simmons (1–2) || Cishek (22) || 26,766 || 46–52
|-  style="text-align:center; bgcolor="#bbffbb"
| 99 || July 22 || @ Braves || 6–5 || Turner (3–6) || Minor (3–6) || Cishek (23) || 22,998 || 47–52
|-  style="text-align:center; bgcolor="#ffbbbb"
| 100 || July 23 || @ Braves || 1–6 || Santana (9–6) || Eovaldi (5–6) || — || 20,102 || 47–53
|-  style="text-align:center; bgcolor="#bbffbb"
| 101 || July 24 || @ Braves || 3–2 || Álvarez (7–5) || Kimbrel (0–2) || Cishek (24) || 26,446 || 48–53
|-  style="text-align:center; bgcolor="#bbffbb"
| 102 || July 25 || @ Astros || 2–0 || Hand (2–2) || Keuchel (9–7) || Cishek (25) || 23,132 || 49–53
|-  style="text-align:center; bgcolor="#bbffbb"
| 103 || July 26 || @ Astros || 7–3 || Koehler (7–7) || Cosart (9–7) || — || 28,968 || 50–53
|-  style="text-align:center; bgcolor="#bbffbb"
| 104 || July 27 || @ Astros || 4–2 || Turner (4–6) || McHugh (4–9) || Cishek (26) || 17,858 || 51–53
|-  style="text-align:center; bgcolor="#bbffbb"
| 105 || July 28 || Nationals || 7–6 || Dunn (8–5) || Soriano (2–1) || — || 20,027 || 52–53
|-  style="text-align:center; bgcolor="#bbffbb"
| 106 || July 29 || Nationals || 3–0 || Álvarez (8–5) || Strasburg (7–9) || Cishek (27) || 22,672 || 53–53
|-  style="text-align:center; bgcolor="#ffbbbb"
| 107 || July 30 || Nationals || 3–4 || Roark (11–6) || Hand (2–3) || Storen (1) || 26,319 || 53–54
|-  style="text-align:center; bgcolor="#ffbbbb"
| 108 || July 31 || Reds || 1–3 || Cueto (12–6) || Koehler (7–8) || Chapman (24) || 18,056 || 53–55
|-

|-  style="text-align:center; bgcolor="#ffbbbbbb"
| 109 || August 1 || Reds || 2–5 || Latos (3–3) || Cosart (9–8) || Chapman (25) || 20,410 || 53–56
|-  style="text-align:center; bgcolor="#bbffbb"
| 110 || August 2 || Reds || 2–1 (10) || Dunn (9–5) || LeCure (1–3) || — || 25,159 || 54–56
|-  style="text-align:center; bgcolor="#ffbbbb"
| 111 || August 3 || Reds || 3–7 || Leake (9–9) || Turner (4–7) || — || 26,707 || 54–57
|-  style="text-align:center; bgcolor="#bbffbb"
| 112 || August 5 || @ Pirates || 6–3 || Ramos (5–0) || Hughes (6–3) || — || 26,734 || 55–57
|-  style="text-align:center; bgcolor="#ffbbbb"
| 113 || August 6 || @ Pirates || 3–7 || Locke (3–3) || Koehler (7–9) || — || 26,976 || 55–58
|-  style="text-align:center; bgcolor="#ffbbbb"
| 114 || August 7 || @ Pirates || 2–7 || Vólquez (9–7) || Flynn (0–1) || — || 29,035 || 55–59
|-  style="text-align:center; bgcolor="#bbffbb"
| 115 || August 8 || @ Reds || 2–1 || Eovaldi (6–6) || Leake (9–10) || Cishek (28) || 31,193 || 56–59
|-  style="text-align:center; bgcolor="#bbffbb"
| 116 || August 9 || @ Reds || 4–3 || Penny (1–0) || LeCure (1–4) || Cishek (29) || 34,768 || 57–59
|-  style="text-align:center; bgcolor="#ffbbbb"
| 117 || August 10 || @ Reds || 2–7 || Cueto (14–6) || Hand (2–4) || — || 36,122 || 57–60
|-  style="text-align:center; bgcolor="#bbffbb"
| 118 || August 11 || Cardinals || 6–5 || Koehler (8–9) || Miller (8–9) || Cishek (30) || 21,144 || 58–60
|-  style="text-align:center; bgcolor="#bbffbb"
| 119 || August 12 || Cardinals || 3–0 || Cosart (10–8) || Wainwright (14–7) || Dunn (1) || 22,703 || 59–60
|-  style="text-align:center; bgcolor="#ffbbbb"
| 120 || August 13 || Cardinals || 2–5 || Masterson (6–7) || Eovaldi (6–7) || — || 20,044 || 59–61
|-  style="text-align:center; bgcolor="#bbffbb"
| 121 || August 14 || Diamondbacks || 5–4 (10) || Dunn (10–5) || Hagens (0–1) || — || 17,074 || 60–61
|-  style="text-align:center; bgcolor="#ffbbbb"
| 122 || August 15 || Diamondbacks || 2–3 || Cahill (3–8) || Hand (2–5) || Reed (29) || 18,286 || 60–62
|-  style="text-align:center; bgcolor="#bbffbb"
| 123 || August 16 || Diamondbacks || 2–1 || Álvarez (9–5) || Miley (7–9) || Cishek (31) || 19,563 || 61–62
|-  style="text-align:center; bgcolor="#bbffbb"
| 124 || August 17 || Diamondbacks || 10–3 || Koehler (9–9) || Collmenter (8–7) || — || 19,296 || 62–62
|-  style="text-align:center; bgcolor="#bbffbb"
| 125 || August 19 || Rangers || 4–3 (10) || Dyson (2–0) || Cotts (2–7) || — || 20,277 || 63–62
|-  style="text-align:center; bgcolor="#ffbbbb"
| 126 || August 20 || Rangers || 4–5 || Martinez (3–9) || Eovaldi (6–8) || Feliz (5) || 16,672 || 63–63
|-  style="text-align:center; bgcolor="#bbffbb"
| 127 || August 22 || @ Rockies || 13–5 || Álvarez (10–5) || Morales (5–7) || — || 30,674 || 64–63
|-  style="text-align:center; bgcolor="#ffbbbb"
| 128 || August 23 || @ Rockies || 4–5 (13) || Belisle (4–6) || Dyson (2–1) || — || 31,109 || 64–64
|-  style="text-align:center; bgcolor="#ffbbbb"
| 129 || August 24 || @ Rockies || 4–7 || Bergman (1–2) || Hand (2–6) || Hawkins (20) || 40,509 || 64–65
|-  style="text-align:center; bgcolor="#bbffbb"
| 130 || August 25 || @ Angels || 7–1 || Cosart (11–8) || LeBlanc (0–1) || — || 35,350 || 65–65
|-  style="text-align:center; bgcolor="#ffbbbb"
| 131 || August 26 || @ Angels || 2–8 || Shoemaker (13–4) || Eovaldi (6–9) || — || 33,028 || 65–66
|-  style="text-align:center; bgcolor="#ffbbbb"
| 132 || August 27 || @ Angels || 1–6 || Santiago (4–7) || Álvarez (10–6) || — || 34,657 || 65–67
|-  style="text-align:center; bgcolor="#ffbbbb"
| 133 || August 29 || @ Braves || 2–5 || Carpenter (5–3) || Hatcher (0–2) || Kimbrel (40) || 26,278 || 65–68
|-  style="text-align:center; bgcolor="#bbffbb"
| 134 || August 30 || @ Braves || 4–0 || Cosart (12–8) || Harang (10–9) || — || 25,335 || 66–68
|-  style="text-align:center; bgcolor="#ffbbbb"
| 135 || August 31 || @ Braves || 0–1 || Wood (10–10) || Eovaldi (6–10) || Kimbrel (41) || 45,754 || 66–69
|-

|-  style="text-align:center; bgcolor="#bbffbb"
| 136 || September 1 || Mets || 9–6 || Ramos (6–0) || Familia (2–4) || Cishek (32) || 23,090 || 67–69 
|-  style="text-align:center; bgcolor="#ffbbbb"
| 137 || September 2 || Mets || 6–8 || Niese (8–10) || Penny (1–1) || Mejía (22) || 17,745 || 67–70
|-  style="text-align:center; bgcolor="#ffbbbb"
| 138 || September 3 || Mets || 3–4 || Torres (6–5) || Dunn (10–6) || Mejía (23) || 17,737 || 67–71
|-  style="text-align:center; bgcolor="#bbffbb"
| 139 || September 5 || Braves || 11–3 || Cosart (13–8) || Harang (10–10) || — || 19,951 || 68–71
|-  style="text-align:center; bgcolor="#ffbbbb"
| 140 || September 6 || Braves || 3–4 (10) || Carpenter (6–3) || Morris (7–1) || Kimbrel (43) || 25,485 || 68–72
|-  style="text-align:center; bgcolor="#bbffbb"
| 141 || September 7 || Braves || 4–0 || Hand (3–6) || Teherán (13–11) || — || 20,013 || 69–72
|-  style="text-align:center; bgcolor="#bbffbb"
| 142 || September 8 || @ Brewers || 6–4 || Penny (2–1) || Gallardo (8–9) || Cishek (33) || 31,203 || 70–72
|-  style="text-align:center; bgcolor="#bbffbb"
| 143 || September 9 || @ Brewers || 6–3 || Morris (8–1) || Rodríguez (4–5) || Cishek (34) || 29,590 || 71–72
|-  style="text-align:center; bgcolor="#ffbbbb"
| 144 || September 10 || @ Brewers || 1–4 || Peralta (16–10) || Cosart (13–9) || Rodríguez (40) || 25,219 || 71–73
|-  style="text-align:center; bgcolor="#ffbbbb"
| 145 || September 11 || @ Brewers || 2–4 || Fiers (6–2) || Eovaldi (6–11) || Rodríguez (41) || 34,028 || 71–74
|-  style="text-align:center; bgcolor="#ffbbbb"
| 146 || September 12 || @ Phillies || 1–3 (10) || Diekman (5–4) || Jennings (0–2) || — || 27,039 || 71–75
|-  style="text-align:center; bgcolor="#ffbbbb"
| 147 || September 13 || @ Phillies || 1–2 || Kendrick (9–12) || Hand (3–7) || Papelbon (37) || 26,163 || 71–76
|-  style="text-align:center; bgcolor="#bbffbb"
| 148 || September 14 || @ Phillies || 5–4 || DeSclafani (2–2) || Papelbon (2–3) || Cishek (35) || 30,201 || 72–76
|-  style="text-align:center; bgcolor="#bbffbb"
| 149 || September 15 || @ Mets || 6–5 || || || || || 73–76
|-  style="text-align:center; bgcolor="#ffbbbb"
| 150 || September 16 || @ Mets || 1–9 || || || || || 73–77
|-  style="text-align:center; bgcolor="#bbffbb"
| 151 || September 17 || @ Mets || 4–3 || || || || || 74–77
|-  style="text-align:center; bgcolor="#ffbbbb"
| 152 || September 18 || Nationals || 2–6 ||  González (9–10) || Hand (3–8) ||  || 18,010 || 74–78
|-  style="text-align:center; bgcolor="#ffbbbb"
| 153 || September 19 || Nationals || 2–3 ||  Fister (15–6) || Koehler (9–10) || Storen (8) || 19,815 || 74–79
|-  style="text-align:center; bgcolor="#ffbbbb"
| 154 || September 20 || Nationals || 2–3 ||  Zimmermann (13–5) || Cosart (13–10) || Storen (9) || 20,983 || 74–80
|-  style="text-align:center; bgcolor="#ffbbbb"
| 155 || September 21 || Nationals || 1–2 ||  Strasburg (13–11) || Eovaldi (6–13) || Soriano (32) || 22,806 || 74–81
|-  style="text-align:center; bgcolor="#bbffbb"
| 156 || September 23 || Phillies || 2–0 || || || || || 75–81
|-  style="text-align:center; bgcolor="#ffbbbb"
| 157 || September 24 || Phillies || 1–2 || || || || || 75–82
|-  style="text-align:center; bgcolor="#bbffbb"
| 158 || September 25 || Phillies || 6–4 || || || || || 76–82
|-  style="text-align:center; bgcolor="#ffbbbb"
| 159 || September 26 (1) || @ Nationals || 0–4 ||  Fister (16–6) || Cosart (4–4) || || 27,920 || 76–83
|-  style="text-align:center; bgcolor="#bbffbb"
| 160 || September 26 (2) || @ Nationals || 15–7 || Ramos (7–0) || Hill (0–1) || || 34,190 || 77–83
|-  style="text-align:center; bgcolor="#ffbbbb"
| 161 || September 27 || @ Nationals || 1–5 ||  Strasburg (14–11) || Eovaldi (6–14) || || 37,529 || 77–84
|-  style="text-align:center; bgcolor="#ffbbbb"
| 162 || September 28 || @ Nationals || 0–1 ||  Zimmermann (14–5) || Álvarez (12–7) || || 35,085 || 77–85
|-

|- style="text-align:center;"
| Legend:       = Win       = Loss       = PostponementBold = Marlins team member

Roster

2014 Player stats
Note: All batting and pitching leaders in each category are in bold.

All batting and pitching data updated through September 28, 2014.

Batting
Note: G = Games played; AB = At bats; R = Runs scored; H = Hits; 2B = Doubles; 3B = Triples; HR = Home runs; RBI = Runs batted in; AVG = Batting average; SB = Stolen bases

Pitching
Note: W = Wins; L = Losses; ERA = Earned run average; G = Games pitched; GS = Games started; SV = Saves; IP = Innings pitched; H = Hits allowed; R = Runs allowed; ER = Earned runs allowed; BB = Walks allowed;  K = Strikeouts

Farm system

LEAGUE CHAMPIONS: Jacksonville

References

External links

2014 Miami Marlins season at Baseball Reference

Miami Marlins season
Miami Marlins
Miami Marlins seasons